The Milan Triennial VII was the triennial in Milan sanctioned by the Bureau of International Expositions (BIE) on the 9 November 1938.
Its theme was Order - Tradition. 
It was held at the Palazzo dell'Arte and ran from 6 April 1940 to 9 June 1940, when Italy entered the Second World War.

References 

1940 in Italy
Tourist attractions in Milan
World's fairs in Milan